The 1941 Rose Poly Engineers football team was an American football team that represented Rose Polytechnic Institute as a member of the Indiana Intercollegiate Conference during the 1941 college football season. In its 14th season under head coach Phil Brown, the team compiled a 7–0 record (4–0 against IIC opponents), won the conference championship, and outscored opponents by a total of 229 to 34.

Freshman halfback Eddie McGovern scored 103 points (16 touchdowns, 7 extra points) for the season, including 34 points in the final game of the season against . Halfback Harold Bowsher added 55 points. Four Rose Poly players were selected by The Indianapolis News to its All-Indiana college football teams: McGovern (1st team); Bowsher (2nd team); tackle Martin Cavanaugh (1st team); and back Earl Michaels (1st team).

Schedule

References

Rose Poly
Rose–Hulman Fightin' Engineers football seasons
College football undefeated seasons
Rose Poly football